Devonshire Mall is a shopping mall in Windsor, Ontario, Canada. It was built in 1970 at the location of the former Devonshire Raceway, a horse racing track, that had existed since 1935. The mall has been expanded several times since its opening, in 1981, 1996, 1999-2002, 2008, and 2018. At over 175 stores, it is by far the largest mall in Windsor.

Devonshire Mall was sold by HOOPP in 2022 to H&R Reit and is currently operated by Primaris REIT.

See also
 Canada's largest shopping malls

References

External links
 Devonshire Mall

Shopping malls in Ontario
Shopping malls established in 1970
Buildings and structures in Windsor, Ontario
Tourist attractions in Windsor, Ontario